Relhania, is a genus of African plants in the pussy's-toes tribe within the sunflower family. Their flowerheads are yellow-to-orange, and each is solitary, on a short stem near the apex of a branch.

 Species

 formerly included
Several species now in other genera: Amphiglossa Athanasia Comborhiza Nestlera Oedera Rhynchopsidium

References

Gnaphalieae
Asteraceae genera
Flora of Africa
Taxa named by Charles Louis L'Héritier de Brutelle